Aditya Jassi (born 21 March 1982, New Delhi, India) is an Indian singer-songwriter, composer, record producer and musician.

Biography 
Aditya Jassi was born in New Delhi, India, and is the son of documentary film-makers and authors Jaswin Jassi and Kiran Jassi. He initially studied in Air Force Bal Bharati School, at Lodhi Road in Delhi, and later went to a boarding school viz. "Welham Boys' School" at Dehradun. It was at Welham Boys' that he was introduced to and immediately fell in love with music and theatre. However, in his college days, theatre took a back seat to music and sports.

As an English graduate from Delhi University, music was still not a professional choice for Aditya, so he pursued civil aviation, while teaching music in colleges alongside as a hobby. Despite holding a private pilot license from the Delhi Flying Club, he switched several jobs- from freelance print journalist to copywriter before completing his post-graduate studies in Mass Communication. Thereafter, he joined Sahara News Channel as a reporter, producer, and anchor. But since his heart was in music and music was all he wanted to do, he quit his job at Sahara in 2006, to pursue music professionally. Currently, he is a prominent singer and musician and is the frontman of a live band called "The Unplugged Project".

Career in Music

In 2006, at the behest of his friend Dr. Palash Sen (Euphoria), Jassi auditioned for FAME-X, and made it to the top ten of this reality show contest aired on Sony and SAB TV "FAME X" on Sony starring Daler Mehndi, Palash Sen, Nikhil Chinappa/Rannvijay Singh/Cyrus Broacha).

Aditya also featured in the Fame-X song Chal Udiye, featuring top ten finalists of the reality show.

Besides bagging a major music label deal with Universal Music, front man Aditya has been winning many accolades with his previous Rock band Oritus, some of them being, ‘Rock Album of the Year’ at the first ever JD Rock Awards in 2007 and a Reality TV music competitions around the same time .

Aditya is a self confessed Grunge & Classic Rock fan, but also loves retro Hindi music. A Singer- Songwriter, he has also learnt the nuances of Indian Classical music and is equally adroit in Indian Classical and Sufi music which is evident from his personal sound. 

He is also a playback singer, having ventured into Bollywood debuting with a song for the Jimmy Shergill and KK Menon starrer, "Strangers" in 2007, a song for "Dil Kabaddi" starring Irfan Khan, Konkona Sen in 2014. He is listed as an artist on Apple Music.

Around 5 years ago he founded his current live band "The Unplugged Project". The band has been extensively touring all over the world, having played close to 800 shows across all platforms- Corporates, private, Clubs, Colleges, Music Festivals and he has shared stage with some humongous acts like Grammy nominees Hoobastank, the legendary Shankar Ehsaan Loy, Mohit Chauhan, Usha Utthap, Kailash Kher, Euphoria, Rabbi Shergill, Suraj Jagan, Thermal and a Quarter, Guru Randhawa, Local Train, and many more.

Aditya's energy as the frontman is contagious. The Unplugged Project released their first original "Faasle" in the year 2019. Aditya is currently working on another album along with playing a plethora of live gigs across the world.

Film career 

After FAME-X, Aditya ventured into Bollywood, debuting with the song "Yaad Aaye Who Din" for the Jimmy Shergill-KK Menon starrer Strangers, released in 2007. He launched his band Ni9Ne with music producer and guitar player Sachin Gupta. 

Aditya continued his bollywood stint by singing "Uthale Ya Phenk De" for the Irffan Khan Rahul Bose Konkona Sen Sharma and Soha Ali Khan starrer "Dil Kabbadi". 
 
Aditya also sang the fun and frolic song "Tension Lene Ka Nahi" for the Manoj Bajpayee Hrishitaa Bhatt Vijay Raaz starrer "Jugaad" in year 2009.

Seven/7 

The debut album 7 was released in 2013 via Universal Music India. the song of the week on iTunes. The album was co-produced by Vinayak Gupta and mixed by Vijay Dayal at Yash Raj Studios. 

The album is available on Apple Music and Spotify. Some superhit songs are also available on Songdew.

References

Indian male singer-songwriters
Indian singer-songwriters
Living people
1982 births
Singers from Delhi